Nagla Sharki (or Nagla Purvi) is a village in Jagat Tehsil, Budaun district, Uttar Pradesh, India.

Nagla Sharki is located 4 kilometers from Budaun city. It is best known by the goddess Kali Devi temple Nagla Mandir. Nagla Sharki village is administrated by Sarpanch of the village. Kurmi is the majority caste of people in the village.

The Budaun railway station is located at the distance of 1 kilometer from the village.

Current Sarpanch of Nagla Sharki is Preeti Singh w/o Rajneesh Singh (Acharya).

References

External links

 Villagewise Population From Census 1991 District BUDAUN
 Nagla Sharki- Jagat nearby Cities, Stations and Tourist Places
 Nagla Sharki Map
 Nagla Sharki Weather Map - Nearby Places

Villages in Budaun district